Margaret Dorothy Green (1929-2017) nurse leader OBE FRCN. Green was a senior Royal College of Nursing employee 1966-1990 and was instrumental in setting up the UKCC, the forerunner of the Nursing and Midwifery Council.  Through UKCC, Green introduced major changes to nurse education such as Project 2000 and PREP.

Green qualified as a nurse in 1955.  She first joined the Royal College of Nursing in December 1965 as a Tutor in the then Education Division where she first helped to organize ward sisters' courses for UK and overseas nurses. In 1966, when the Salmon Report was published, she planned two of the first experimental first-line management courses for staff nurses and ward sisters. In June 1973 Green become Head of the Professional Nursing Department. In 1976 she took up the post of RCN Director of Education and Principal of the Institute of Advanced Nursing Education, a post she held until her retirement in 1990.  

Green was instrumental in setting up the United Kingdom Central Council for Nursing, Midwifery and Health Visiting (UKCC)[1] and was Chair of the English National Board. 

In 1986 Green chaired the committee which initiated a major UKCC plan to modernise nursing education by the end of the millennium, called Project 2000. This major scheme sought to expand the provision of nursing degrees in the United Kingdom to ensure that entry level nursing qualifications for registered nurses were at degree level.

Green was also heavily involved in UKCC's Post-registration Education and Practice (PREP). PREP took several years to introduce, with the final framework being agreed in 1994, and the scheme itself being introduced in 1995. PREP developed into the current scheme of Revalidation which was implemented in April 2016.

Green was appointed an Officer of the Order of the British Empire (OBE) in the 1986 Birthday Honours List.

In 1987 Green was awarded Fellowship of the Royal College of Nursing, FRCN

Green died on 30 March 2017, aged 87.

References 

British nurses
Fellows of the Royal College of Nursing